Daniel Magnusson may refer to:
 Daniel Magnusson (ice hockey), Swedish ice hockey centre
 Daniel Magnusson (curler), Swedish curler